Thomas Joseph Irwin (born August 8, 1949), known professionally as "Shotgun Tom" Kelly, is an American radio and television personality, two-time Emmy award winner, Billboard Air Personality of the Year winner and recipient of a star on the Hollywood Walk of Fame.

Born in San Diego, Kelly worked  at KDEO, KPRI, KGB, KCBQ, KOGO, KBZS and KFMB-FM before replacing the late Don Steele in the afternoon slot at Los Angeles oldies station KRTH-FM, K-Earth 101. In August 2015, he was taken off the air and became KRTH's "Ambassador," doing personal appearances throughout Southern California. He eventually returned to the air as a weekend host. He exited KRTH in November 2016. In September 2018, he debuted on SiriusXM Satellite Radio's '60s On 6 channel.

Early life

Thomas Joseph Irwin was born in San Diego, California at Mercy Hospital. He attended Our Lady of the Sacred Heart and Saint John of the Cross parochial schools for his elementary years. He attended Mount Miguel High School and was the announcer for the morning bulletin. In high school, he joined Junior Achievement which had a radio show on KOGO.

At ten, his mother, La Von Irwin (née Driscoll), mentioned to Tom that there was a disc jockey doing a radio show in a shopping center in Lemon Grove, California. The disc jockey was Frank Thompson on KOGO-AM, who saw the young Tom Irwin looking through the window and interviewed him on the air. Following that experience, Tom became fascinated with radio shows, even putting together his own mock radio studio in his bedroom.

A few years later, 13 year-old Tom went to other radio stations and watched the disc jockeys on the air. Tom visited Radio KDEO where he met program director "Sunny Jim" Price, who wanted to get a teenager's opinion of a song he was considering adding to the playlist. Price played the song for Tom, who liked it. The song was "California Dreamin'" by The Mamas & The Papas. Radio KDEO was the first station in the country to play it. Price gave Tom his first job at a radio station helping with remote broadcasts.

Early career – 1960s

In 1966, at the age of 16, Tom was hired by Program Director George Manning to work on Sunday mornings at KPRI-FM 106.5 in San Diego, playing "beautiful music" and standards.  Every Sunday morning, he also did a children's radio show, "The Uncle Tommy Show", and played recordings from Disney Records. After high school, he attended the William B. Ogden Radio Operational Engineering school. He graduated in 1969 with his FCC First Class radio license and went to work at KYOS in Merced, California.

1970s

At 21, Tom worked at KACY in Port Hueneme, California using the name Bobby McAllister. There, he met DJ Dave Conley who named him Bobby "Shotgun" McAllister. Less than a year later, Tom and Dave moved to radio station KAFY in Bakersfield, California. Tom wanted to use his real name, but the general manager did not like the name Irwin, and asked Tom to change his last name on the air to Kelly. Dave Conley suggested the name "Shotgun," from Bobby "Shotgun" McAllister, and they ended up using the name "Shotgun Tom" Kelly. In addition to radio, Tom took a weekend job at television station KERO, and did a television kid's show as NEMO the Clown.

In 1971, Tom was offered an opportunity to return to his hometown, San Diego, California when Charlie Van Dyke hired him at Boss Radio 136/KGB. Less than a year later, he was hired by Buzz Bennett to work at KCBQ. In 1972 Tom returned to 136/KGB.

Shortly thereafter, he joined Buzz Bennett for a job at KRIZ in Phoenix. He returned to San Diego and was on air weekday afternoons at KCBQ. It was while at KCBQ that Tom started wearing his trademark ranger hat.

During this time, he was asked to host the kids' TV game show "Words-A-Poppin" airing on KGTV Channel 10 in San Diego, and syndicated to other cities. He won an Emmy for Words-A-Poppin' that same year.

In 1976, Shotgun Tom hosted a local television show in San Diego called, "Disco 10," which aired on KGTV on Saturdays at 12:30pm. As they would on the more popular, nationally syndicated, "American Bandstand", local high school kids would dance on Disco 10, then get to watch themselves on television at a later date.

In 1976, Tom was hired by Bobby Rich to be the morning man at KFMB-FM, known as "B-100". Tom won the 1976 Billboard Magazine Air Personality of the Year Award and remained at B-100 for the next four years. In 1978, Tom won a second Emmy for Words-A-Poppin'.

1980s
While at B100, Kelly was offered a position at KUSI-TV as a booth announcer/on camera children's TV host with cartoons on The KUSI Kids Club. He hosted the KUSI Kids Club for 12 years.

In November 1987, Congressman Duncan Hunter invited Kelly to the White House to meet President Ronald Reagan. While visiting, Tom presented the President with one of his trademark ranger hats, which President Reagan donned for a photo op.

In 1989 Mark Larson hired Tom at KFMB-AM to do a radio show from David Cohn's Corvette Diner in Hillcrest, and at The T-Bird Diner in Escondido.

1990s
In 1993, Kelly was hired to work at KBZT K-Best-95 in San Diego. In September 1997, he was hired to succeed the late Real Don Steele and work in afternoon drive at KRTH K-Earth 101.

2000s
On August 28, 2010, Kelly hosted the dedication of a monument at the former site of the KCBQ building and its six, 200-foot towers. The dedication was attended by over 400 of the radio station's fans and former on air personalities.

Television
Kelly has appeared on several television stations since the early 1970s. In 1970, he took a weekend job at television station KERO, Bakersfield to host a Saturday morning television kids show as NEMO the Clown. In 1972, Kelly was asked to host Words-A'Poppin', a game show for kids. The show aired in San Diego on KGTV Channel 10, and was also syndicated in several other cities. Kelly went on to win two Emmy Awards as host for the show.

That same year, Kelly was invited to host the Jerry Lewis MDA Telethon; he would serve as host of the telethon for more than 30 years. In 1982, he was offered a position at KUSI-TV as a booth announcer and on-camera host on The KUSI Kids Club. Tom would continue as host of the show for 12 years. He has also served as station announcer for WFLX-TV FOX 29 in West Palm Beach, Florida. 

Kelly has also appeared on the Southern California-centric show Storage Wars.

Voice over
Shotgun Tom's voice is featured in the motion picture Déjà Vu, starring Denzel Washington, and on America's Most Wanted and Spike TV's 1000 Ways to Die.

Tom also did voice work for his hometown San Diego Chargers. Tom's voice could be heard on the Jumbotron during Chargers home games.

Kelly's voice is heard on Fred Falke's song "Radio Days".

Hollywood Walk of Fame
On April 30, 2013, "Shotgun Tom" Kelly was honored with a Star on the Hollywood Walk of Fame. His star is located adjacent to another K-Earth personality, The Real Don Steele.

References

External links
"Shotgun Tom" Kelly's official website
"Shotgun Tom" Kelly's Facebook page
SiriusXM 60s on 6
KEARTH 101's Page

American radio DJs
American radio personalities
Living people
1949 births
People from San Diego